Shaquille Riley Graciano Pinas (born 19 March 1998) is a professional footballer who plays as a centre back or left-back for Hammarby IF in the Swedish Allsvenskan. Born in the Netherlands, he represents the Suriname national team.

Club career

ADO Den Haag
Pinas made his professional debut in the Eerste Divisie for FC Dordrecht on 20 January 2017 in a game against Jong FC Utrecht.

In the summer of 2017, Pinas moved to ADO Den Haag, initially being available in the club's under-23's. On 16 December 2017, he made his Eredivisie debut for the senior squad in a 0–3 away loss to PSV Eindhoven.

On 13 June 2018, Pinas signed a new three-year contract with ADO Den Haag.

At the end of the 2020–21 season, following the club's relegation from the Eredivisie, ADO Den Haag announced his departure. In total, Pinas made 81 competitive appearances across four seasons, scoring six goals.

Ludogorets Razgrad
On 29 June 2021, Pinas joined Ludogorets Razgrad in the Bulgarian First League, linking up with fellow Dutch player Sergio Padt. Throughout the 2021–22 season, Pinas made 17 league appearances for the club, that won their eleventh consecutive domestic title.

Hammarby IF
On 11 July 2022, Pinas signed a three and a half year-contract with Hammarby IF in the Swedish Allsvenskan.

International career
Born in the Netherlands, Pinas is of Surinamese descent. He made his debut for Suriname national football team on 24 March 2021 in a World Cup qualifier against the Cayman Islands and scored the opening goal in a 3–0 victory.

International goals
Scores and results list Suriname's goal tally first, score column indicates score after each Pinas goal.

Career statistics

Honours
Ludogorets Razgrad
Bulgarian First League: 2021–22

References

External links
 
 
 OnsOranje Profile

1998 births
Living people
Footballers from Rotterdam
Surinamese footballers
Suriname international footballers
Dutch footballers
Netherlands youth international footballers
Association football defenders
Dutch sportspeople of Surinamese descent
Expatriate footballers in Bulgaria
Surinamese expatriate sportspeople in Bulgaria
Expatriate footballers in Sweden
Surinamese expatriate sportspeople in Sweden
Eredivisie players
Eerste Divisie players
First Professional Football League (Bulgaria) players
Second Professional Football League (Bulgaria) players
Allsvenskan players
SC Feyenoord players
Alphense Boys players
FC Dordrecht players
ADO Den Haag players
PFC Ludogorets Razgrad players
PFC Ludogorets Razgrad II players
Hammarby Fotboll players